Indohyus is an extinct genus of digitigrade even-toed ungulates known from Eocene fossils in Asia. This small chevrotain-like animal found in the Himalayas is one of the earliest known non-cetacean ancestors of whales.

Discovery
The fossils were discovered among rocks that had been collected more than 30 years ago in Kashmir by the Indian geologist A. Ranga Rao who found a few teeth and parts of a jawbone, but when he died many rocks had yet to be broken open. Ranga Rao's widow gave the rocks to Hans Thewissen, who was working on them when his technician accidentally broke one of the skulls they had found and Thewissen recognised the ear structure of the auditory bulla, formed from the ectotympanic bone in a shape which is highly distinctive, found only in the skulls of cetaceans both living and extinct, including Pakicetus.

Paleobiology
About the size of a raccoon or domestic cat, this omnivorous pig-like creature shared some of the traits of whales, and showed signs of adaptations to aquatic life. Their bones were similar to the bones of modern creatures such as the hippopotamus, and helped reduce buoyancy so that they could stay underwater. This suggests a survival strategy similar to that of the African mousedeer or water chevrotain which, when threatened by a bird of prey, dives into water and hides beneath the surface for up to four minutes.

From isotopes and the structure of the bones in the fossils Indohyus had heavy bones. Heavy bones help reduce the buoyancy of living aquatic mammals so that they do not float up to the surface of the water.

Classification

Raoellids may be the "missing link" sister group to whales (Cetacea). All other Artiodactyla are "cousins" of these two groups. 18O values and osteosclerotic bones indicate that the raccoon-like or chevrotain-like Indohyus was habitually aquatic, but 13C values suggest that it rarely fed in the water. The authors suggest this documents an intermediate step in the transition back to water completed by the whales, and suggests a new understanding of the evolution of cetaceans.

References

Eocene even-toed ungulates
Eocene mammals of Asia
Transitional fossils
Fossil taxa described in 1971